Jabuka (Serbian Cyrillic: Јабука) is a mountain and plateau on the border between Serbia and Montenegro, between towns of Prijepolje and Pljevlja. Its highest peak Slatina has an elevation of 1,412 meters above sea level.

References

Mountains of Serbia
Mountains of Montenegro
Montenegro–Serbia border